Bom Dia may refer to:
Bom Dia, a newspaper in São José do Rio Preto
Bom Dia Brasil, a Brazilian television news program on Rede Globo
Bom Dia & Companhia, a morning children's television block that aired on SBT
Bom Dia Portugal, a television program on RTP Informação
Café Bom Dia, coffee producer
Bom Dia (album), a 2004 album by Pluto